Terence James Thomas, Baron Thomas of Macclesfield,  (19 October 1937 – 1 July 2018) was a British politician and banker, member of the Labour and Co-operative parties.

Career
Thomas was a pupil at Queen Elizabeth Grammar School in Carmarthen, where his father (William Emrys Thomas 1911–1993) was a transport manager and his mother (Mildred Evelyn née James) ran a greengrocery. He did his national service in the army, serving at Shrapnel Barracks in Woolwich, south east London. He then joined the National Provincial Bank.

Thomas joined the Co-operative Bank in 1973 as marketing manager. He served as chief executive of the bank for nine years, before retiring in the late 1990s. He suffered a stroke in 1999; in his 2010 autobiography, he says this was caused by a hole in the heart of which he had been unaware.

He was Chairman of the East Manchester Partnership (1990–1996) and founding Chairman of the North West Partnership. Thomas later served as Chair of Capita Group (1997–98). He was a member of the House of Lords Monetary Policy & European Affairs Select Committees. He is a member of the Regional Policy Forum, President of the Society for Co-operative Studies, Honorary President of the North West Co-operative and Mutual Council and Life President of the North West Business Leadership Team.

He died on 1 July 2018 at the age of 80.

Honours
Having been appointed a Commander of the Order of the British Empire (CBE) in the 1997 Birthday Honours, he was created a life peer as Baron Thomas of Macclesfield, of Prestbury in the County of Cheshire on 5 November 1997. He sat in the House of Lords until 18 May 2016, at which point he ceased to be a member pursuant to section 2 of the House of Lords Reform Act 2014, having failed to attend during the whole of the 2015-16 session without being on leave of absence.

References

Further reading
 

1937 births
2018 deaths
Thomas of Macclesfield
Life peers created by Elizabeth II
British businesspeople
Commanders of the Order of the British Empire
The Co-operative Group